All Gas. No Brake. is the debut release of the Christian pop punk band, Stellar Kart.  The album was released February 15, 2005 under Word Records.

Awards
In 2006, the album was nominated for Rock Album of the Year at the 37th GMA Dove Awards.

Critical reception

The album was received to mixed reviews, some affirming it for a good debut, others noting the album was nothing above average.

Kim Jones of Ask.com positively stated: "If you're a pop/punk fan, you'll love Stellar Kart's All Gas. No Brake. If you're not a fan, you should still give it a listen. The high energy, high impact songs are all well done with a lot of skill and a lot of passion....All in all, I'd have to say that Stellar Kart's freshman release is a good one and I expect to see great things out of this young band in the future."

John DiBiase of Jesus Freak Hideout went on to say: "With music drawing heavy influences from artists like Relient K and Blink-182, Stellar Kart has the strength to carry the pop/punk torch into the Christian industry, but doesn't entirely add anything new to the genre. That essentially isn't really a problem because Stellar Kart does the style very well...Stellar Kart's All Gas. No Brake. isn't a perfect debut, but it possesses enough momentum to make it worth checking out. Pop-punk fans alike should find plenty to like about Stellar Kart."

On the flipside, Nathan of New Release Tuesday frankly said: "The messages are mostly lame, the music while snappy, begins to wear on the listener after a few spins. All Gas. No Brake. is a rough debut which has potential but, the wise buyer will skip the CD."

Track listing

Personnel

Stellar Kart
Adam Agee - lead vocals, guitar
Cody Pellerin - guitar
Tay Sitera - bass
Jordan Messer - drums

Production
Tony Palacios - additional production, recording, mixing
Kenzi Butler - mixing assistant
Jim Cooper - vocal edits
Tresa Jordan - vocal edits
Nathan Dantzler - mastering

Additional personnel
Blaine Barcus - A&R
Cheryl H. McTyre - A&R administration
Mark Lusk - artist development
Katherine Petillo - creative direction
Blair Berle - senior creative administration
Sally Carns Gulde - art design
Jimmy Abegg - photography
Shannan Shepard - wardrobe styling
Robin Geary - grooming

Music videos

References 

2005 debut albums
Stellar Kart albums
Word Records albums